A public market is a type of marketplace.

Public market may also refer to:

Types of marketplaces
Financial market, especially those accessible to the general population
Wet market, especially those that are community or government-owned

Places
Boston Public Market – Boston, Massachusetts
James Beard Public Market – Portland, Oregon
Milwaukee Public Market – Milwaukee, Wisconsin
Pike Place Public Market – in Seattle, Washington
Portland Public Market – Portland, Oregon